Black Sea is the fourth studio album by the Austrian electronic musician Fennesz. The LP was released on November 25, 2008, while a CD release followed on December 9, 2008 with different artwork. The track "Saffron Revolution" was released as a single prior to the release of the album.

Track listing
 "Black Sea" - 10:11
 "The Colour of Three" - 8:06
 "Perfume For Winter" - 4:35
 "Grey Scale" - 4:09
 "Glide" - 9:22
 "Vacuum" - 3:58
 "Glass Ceiling" - 5:49
 "Saffron Revolution" - 5:52

Tracks 2 and 6 do not appear on the vinyl version.

References

External links
 

2008 albums
Fennesz albums
Touch Music albums